Get Up & Get It! is an album by jazz organist Richard "Groove" Holmes which was recorded in 1967 and released on the Prestige label.

Reception

Stewart Mason of Allmusic stated, "The organ trio format is so ensconced in the minds of soul-jazz fans that hearing this album, which puts Richard "Groove" Holmes' funky Hammond B3 in the context of a larger group, sounds odd and over-produced at first... but thankfully, Holmes' sidemen are up to the task at hand and steer clear of over-playing... The original "Groove's Blue Groove" is a particular highlight, but the entire album is worthy".

Track listing 
 " Get Up and Get It" (Teddy Edwards) - 5:42  
 "Lee Ann" (Edwards) - 5:11  
 "Body and Soul" (Frank Eyton, Johnny Green, Edward Heyman, Robert Sour) - 9:23  
 "Broadway" (Billy Byrd, Teddy McRae, Henri Woode) - 5:26  
 "Groove's Blues Groove" (Richard "Groove" Holmes) - 8:04  
 "Pennies from Heaven" (Johnny Burke, Arthur Johnston) - 6:28

Personnel 
Richard "Groove" Holmes - organ
Teddy Edwards - tenor saxophone
Pat Martino - guitar
Paul Chambers - bass
Billy Higgins - drums

References 

Richard Holmes (organist) albums
1967 albums
Prestige Records albums
Albums recorded at Van Gelder Studio
Albums produced by Don Schlitten